Qəzli (also, Gazli, Kazeli, and Kezli) is a village and municipality in the Sabirabad Rayon of Azerbaijan.  It has a population of 2,711.

References 

Populated places in Sabirabad District